Terra Tomah Mountain is a  mountain summit located in Rocky Mountain National Park, in Larimer County, of Colorado, United States. It is situated 13 miles west of the community of Estes Park, and 1.5 mile east of the Continental Divide. Terra Tomah Mountain is part of the Front Range which is a subset of the Rocky Mountains. It is a prominent landmark viewed from Forest Canyon Overlook along the Trail Ridge Road.

Etymology 

In 1914 George Barnard was hiking here with the Colorado Mountain Club. Inspired by a lake, he chanted a Cahuilla ghost dance song with the lyrics "terra toma", which was popular among students at Pomona College where he attended. The president of the club, James Grafton Rogers, submitted the name for the lake to the federal government for consideration. However, the government erred by applying this name to the mountain instead. In 1923 the club listed it as "Terra Tomah Peak" in their publication, The Mountain Peaks of Colorado. The mountain's current name was officially adopted by the United States Board on Geographic Names in 1932. David Prescott Barrows, who worked with the Cahuilla and taught the song to the college students, was unable to obtain the meaning of the words. The lake was later named Doughnut Lake, and it lies below the west base of the mountain.

Climate 
According to the Köppen climate classification system, Terra Tomah Mountain is located in an alpine subarctic climate zone with cold, snowy winters, and cool to warm summers. Due to its altitude, it receives precipitation all year, as snow in winter, and as thunderstorms in summer, with a dry period in late spring. Precipitation runoff from the mountain drains northeast into the Big Thompson River.

Gallery

See also 

 List of peaks in Rocky Mountain National Park

References

External links 
 Weather forecast: Terra Tomah Mountain

Mountains of Larimer County, Colorado
Mountains of Rocky Mountain National Park
Mountains of Colorado
North American 3000 m summits